Zamboanga del Sur's 3rd congressional district is an obsolete congressional district that encompassed the Sibuguey Bay region, a former territory of Zamboanga del Sur. It was represented in the House of Representatives from its creation under the ordinance annex of the 1987 Constitution of the Philippines that divided the province into three congressional districts, until 2001. The district was dissolved following the ratification of Zamboanga Sibugay's organic law of November 2000 and elected its own provincial at-large representative beginning in May 2001.

Representation history

See also
Legislative districts of Zamboanga del Sur

References

Former congressional districts of the Philippines
Politics of Zamboanga del Sur
1987 establishments in the Philippines
2000 disestablishments in the Philippines
Congressional districts of Zamboanga Peninsula
Constituencies established in 1987
Constituencies disestablished in 2000